The Reward's Yours... The Man's Mine (also known as El puro) is a 1969 Italian Spaghetti Western film directed by Edoardo Mulargia.

It was shown as part of a retrospective on Spaghetti Western at the 64th Venice International Film Festival.

Plot
El Puro, an alcoholic gunslinger on whom hangs a $10,000 bounty, finds refuge in the home of a saloon dancer, Rosy. Five men go after him to kill him, but the killers kill Rosy, and El Puro finds a way to avenge her.

Cast 
 Robert Woods: Joe Bishop 'El Puro' 
 Rosalba Neri: Rosie 
 Marc Fiorini (credited as Ashborn Hamilton Jr.): Gipsy 
 Aldo Berti: Cassidy 
 Mario Brega: Tim 
 Fabrizio Gianni: Fernando 
 Maurizio Bonuglia: Dolph 
 Giusva Fioravanti: Antonio
 Angelo Dessy: Charlie 
 Attilio Dottesio 
 Mariangela Giordano: Babe
Lisa Seagram : saloon owner

References

External links

The Reward's Yours... The Man's Mine at Variety Distribution

1969 films
Spaghetti Western films
1969 Western (genre) films
Films directed by Edoardo Mulargia
Films scored by Alessandro Alessandroni
Films with screenplays by Edoardo Mulargia
1960s Italian-language films
1960s Italian films